Roxy and the Wonderteam (German: Roxy und das Wunderteam) is a 1938 Austrian musical sports film directed by Johann von Vásáry and starring Rosy Barsony, Fritz Imhoff and Hans Holt. It is based on an operetta called Roxy und ihr Wunderteam. A separate Hungarian-language version was also produced. The title is an allusion to the Wunderteam, the acclaimed Austria national football team of the 1930s, and the film features an appearance by former captain Matthias Sindelar as himself.

The film's sets were designed by the art director Márton Vincze.

Cast
 Rosy Barsony as Grete Müller 
 Fritz Imhoff as Herr Müller, ihr Vater  
 Hans Holt as Lazy - Kapitän einer Fussballmannschaft  
 Hortense Raky as Margot  
 Tibor Halmay as Bob, schottischer Hocharistokrat  
 Ferdinand Mayerhofer as Gutsverwalter  
 Oszkár Dénes as Baron Utvary  
 Carmen Perwolf as Liesl  
 Vilma Kurer as Mädchen vom Jachtklub  
 Irma Eckert as Mädchen vom Jachtklub  
 Éva Bíró as Mädchen vom Jacktklub
 Éva Libertiny as Mädchen vom Jachtklub  
 Éva Somogyi as Mädchen vom Jachtklub  
 Maria Horvath as Mädchen vom Jachtklub  
 Matthias Sindelar as Himself - Footballer  
 Geza Toldi as Fußballer  
 Franz Zentner as Fußballer  
 Reggie Riffler as Fußballer  
 Erich Sprung as Fußballer  
 Hans Bräuer as Fußballer  
 Otto Falvay as Fußballer  
 Béla Fáy as  Fußballer  
 Reggie Nalder as  Fußballer

References

Bibliography 
 Waller, Klaus. Paul Abraham. Der tragische König der Operette: Eine Biographie. Zweite, überarbeitete Auflage. 2017.

External links 
 

1938 films
1930s sports films
1930s German-language films
Films directed by Johann von Vásáry
Austrian multilingual films
Austrian association football films
Operetta films
Films based on operettas
Austrian black-and-white films
1938 multilingual films